Morula echinata, common name the prickled-armed ricinula, is a species of sea snail, a marine gastropod mollusk in the family Muricidae, the murex snails or rock snails.

Description
The length of the shell varies between 7 mm and 10 mm.

Distribution
This marine species occurs in the tropical Indo-West Pacific; also off Taiwan and Australia (Queensland).

References

 Reeve, L.A. 1846. Monograph of the genus Ricinula. pls 1–6 in Reeve, L.A. (ed). Conchologia Iconica. London : L. Reeve & Co. Vol. 3.  Plate 6 (fig. 54) and unnumbered page
 Pease, W.H. 1860. Descriptions of new species of Mollusca from the Sandwich Islands, Part II. Proceedings of the Zoological Society of London 28: 141-148
 Cernohorsky, W.O. 1969. The Muricidae of Fiji. Part 2. Subfamily Thaidinae. Veliger 11(4): 293-315 
 Cernohorsky, W.O. 1978. Tropical Pacific Marine Shells. Sydney : Pacific Publications 352 pp., 68 pls.
 Wilson, B. 1994. Australian Marine Shells. Prosobranch Gastropods. Kallaroo, WA : Odyssey Publishing Vol. 2 370 pp. 
 Houart, R. 2002. Comments on a group of small Morula s.s. species (Gastropoda: Muricidae: Rapaninae) from the Indo-Pacific with the description of two new species. Novapex 3(4): 97-118

External links
 

echinata
Gastropods described in 1846